A list of Urdu-language films in year order. The films listed here are mostly from Pakistan along with some Indian Urdu movies. For a full list of Pakistani films which includes Punjabi language and Bengali language films in addition to Urdu see List of Pakistani films. Bollywood movies from India which feature as Hindi films are mostly made in the Hindustani language and similarly Urdu films are also made in Hindustani language. Modern Urdu and modern Hindi are more similar in overall vocabulary. See list of Bollywood films.

1940s

1950s

1960s

1970s

1980s

1990s

2000s

2010s

2020s

See also 
 Cinema in Karachi
 List of Punjabi films
 List of Pashto films
 List of Sindhi films
 List of Bengali films
 Lists of Bollywood films

References

External links
 Search Pakistani film - IMDB.com



Urdu-language films

Urdu-language films
Lists of Pakistani films